Ommolkorm Island (Also: Gorm, Ommolgorom)  (Persian: جزیره ام الکرم, jazireye Ommolkorm) is an uninhabited Iranian island in the Persian Gulf. This Island has an area of some 10–12 km2. It is surrounded by 14 km of sandy beaches suitable for marine turtle nesting although the southern and eastern parts are more heavily used, especially a stretch of 6–700 meters on the east coast used by Hawksbill sea turtles. The island is located southeast of Bushehr.

References
 http://anobanini.com/forum/viewtopic.php?f=6&t=65

Islands of Iran
Landforms of Bushehr Province
Islands of the Persian Gulf